The 2016 Tour of the Basque Country was a road cycling stage race that took place in the Basque Country between 4 and 9 April 2016. It was the 56th edition of the Tour of the Basque Country and the ninth event of the 2016 UCI World Tour.

The race took place over mountainous terrain and was suitable for climbers. The first five stages were mountainous; the sixth and final stage was a hilly individual time trial. The defending champion was Joaquim Rodríguez, with Nairo Quintana, Alberto Contador and Sergio Henao also among the favourites for the overall victory.

Luis León Sánchez won the opening stage, but lost the lead the following day on the first uphill finish to Mikel Landa (Sky). Landa lost the lead on Stage 4, with Wilco Kelderman taking over the lead. On the second uphill finish of the race on the penultimate day, Henao took over the lead after escaping with Contador. Contador then won the time trial on the final stage and beat Henao to the overall victory by 12 seconds, with Quintana a further 23 seconds behind in third. Henao won the points classification, while Nicolas Edet won the intermediate sprints competition and Diego Rosa the mountains classification.

Route 

The route of the 2016 Tour of the Basque Country was generally mountainous, with no stages suited for the sprinters. The second finished with a  climb at an average gradient of 11.7%; the third and fourth stages again contained multiple climbs shortly before the finish. The fifth stage was the most difficult, with the  climb of the Arrate (referred to by its Basque name Usartza and averaging 8.5%), shortly before the finish. The final stage was a hilly individual time trial around Eibar.

Participating teams 
As the Tour of the Basque Country is a UCI World Tour event, all eighteen UCI WorldTeams were invited automatically and were obliged to enter a team in the race. Two UCI Professional Continental teams –  and  – were awarded wildcard places, bringing the number of teams to twenty. As each team included eight riders, there were a total of 160 at the start of the first stage.

Pre-race favourites 

The mountainous terrain meant that the favourites for victory were exclusively climbers; every stage offered the opportunity for attacks. The final two stages (the climb to Arrate and the individual time trial) were expected to be decisive. The top two riders from the 2015 edition, Joaquim Rodríguez and Sergio Henao, both returned to the race. Rodríguez had not been in good form and had not been in the top ten at any race in 2016. Henao had been expected to ride in support of his team's new signing Mikel Landa, but Landa had been ill and was not yet in good form; Henao was therefore his team's leader. The principal favourites, however, were Nairo Quintana and Alberto Contador; both men are former winners of the race (Quintana in 2013 and Contador in 2008, 2009 and 2014). Quintana had beaten Contador the previous month at the Volta a Catalunya. Other favourites included Dan Martin and Fabio Aru, along with Thibaut Pinot, who had won the Critérium International.

Stages

Stage 1 

4 April – Etxebarria to Markina-Xemein, 

The first stage took place over a  course that started in Etxebarria and followed a looping course to finish near the start in Markina-Xemein. The stage began with two third-category climbs, followed by a flat section along the coast, before turning back inland for two second-category climbs; there were then two more third-category climbs. The most difficult climb of the day was the first-category Alto de Ixua ( at 7%); at the summit there were  remaining. This included one more second-category climb – the eighth of the day – and a final  descent to the finish, which came on flat, straight roads.

The day's main breakaway formed after the first climb. It was made up of Gianluca Brambilla, Marcel Wyss, Nicolas Edet and Jonathan Lastra. Brambilla fell back from the break before the third climb of the day, where the lead over the peloton was around three minutes.

Wyss was dropped on the Alto de Ixua, with  remaining, and the lead dropped to less than half a minute. The peloton's chase slowed on the climb, however, and Dario Cataldo was able to attack and come across to the breakaway; he immediately dropped Lastra and, after working with Edet for a while, dropped him too and continued alone. Meanwhile, there were attacks in the peloton, with Philip Deignan (Team Sky) and Wilco Kelderman both attempting to escape. Towards the top of the climb, Alberto Contador attacked and was followed by the other general classification favourites; this acceleration brought Cataldo back to the group. On the final climb, Daniel Navarro (Cofidis) attacked and was joined by Luis León Sánchez (Astana). Sánchez led Navarro down the fast descent; they held a small lead going into the final kilometres. Sánchez sprinted first and Navarro was unable to come past. The main group were very close at the finish, with Simon Gerrans sprinting into third place. Sánchez therefore took the overall lead of the race, with 50 other riders on the same time.

Stage 2 

4 April – Markina-Xemein to Baranbio-Garrastatxu (Amurrio), 

The second stage started where the first had finished, in Markina-Xemein, and headed south-west towards the finish in Amurrio. It began with a second-category climb very early in the stage; after a flat section came two more climbs, one third-category and one second-category. After a long plateau and a descent, the riders arrived in Amurrio for the first time. Most of this was over fairly flat roads as the riders looped around Amurrio, but the final part of the race was a steep climb, the  Alto de Garrastatxu, with an average gradient of 11.7%. The climb started with a section at 11.5%, followed by another at 13.5%; the final part of the climb had a gradient of 9.3%.

The first half of the stage took place in cold and rainy conditions. Nicholas Edet won the first mountain sprint, putting him into the lead of the mountain classification. A breakaway formed in the following kilometres, but the presence of two well-placed  riders (Simone Petilli and Louis Meintjes) meant that the group was not allowed to build an advantage. Stefan Denifl and Ángel Madrazo were part of this group and were then able to escape again, forming a two-man breakaway that led most of the stage. Their lead was over three minutes with  remaining, but fell rapidly; they were caught with  remaining.

Blel Kadri then attacked, but was soon overtaken by Wilco Kelderman (LottoNL–Jumbo) and Mikel Landa (Sky). Going into the final kilometre, they had a 14-second lead. Contador, who had lost the key stage of the Volta a Catalunya after doing too much work on the final climb, waited for the other riders in the group to chase Landa and Kelderman. Rui Costa attempted to bring the two riders back, with Contador, Henao, Rodriguez and Samuel Sánchez following, but they were unable to catch them. In the final few hundred metres, Landa came past Kelderman and took the stage win, his first since signing for Team Sky. Keldeman was second, one second behind Landa, with Henao four seconds further back in third. Landa took over the race lead. After the stage, however, he said that Henao remained the team leader for the rest of the race and that he "could crack tomorrow".

Stage 3 

6 April 2016 – Vitoria-Gasteiz to Lesaka, 

The third stage covered a  route from Vitoria-Gasteiz to Lesaka. The route initially took the riders east along flat roads to Irurtzun, then north towards the coast. Shortly after the turn, there was a third-category climb followed immediately by a second-category climb. There were then flat roads as far as Hernani, when the riders turned east again, through Oiartzun. The final  included three second-category climbs. After the descent, there were flat roads to the finish.

There was an early breakaway formed by Blel Kadri, Sam Oomen, José Gonçalves, Daniel Teklehaimanot (Dimension Data) and, for the second consecutive day, Stefan Denifl (IAM). Gonçalves won the first mountain sprint and Denifl the second, but the group was kept close by the peloton; going into the three final climbs they had just a minute's lead. On the first of these climbs, Denifl attacked the breakaway, with only Oomen able to follow; meanwhile Michael Albasini (Orica–GreenEDGE) attacked from the peloton and was joined by Dario Cataldo (Astana), Daniel Navarro (Cofidis) and Laurens De Plus (Etixx–Quick-Step). Denifl was first to the summit of the day's third climb, with the four chasers around 30 seconds behind.

On the day's penultimate climb, the chasers were joined by Adam Yates (Orica–GreenEDGE) and Pierre Rolland; the whole group then came across to Denifl and Oomen. Denifl once again won the mountain sprint to take the lead in the mountain classification. As both Yates and Rolland were potential threats to Landa's general classification lead, Sky chased hard on the final climb, with the gap at around 15 seconds. Navarro attacked over the summit; Thibaut Pinot (FDJ) attacked from the peloton and was followed by Landa, Quintana, Samuel Sánchez and Rui Costa.  Navarro rode the descent hard and had a small gap to the chasers at the foot, with a larger gap to the main peloton. Rolland and Yates attacked and caught Navarro; all the breakaway riders were finally caught with under  remaining.

Within the last , Steve Cummings attacked solo and held on to take the stage win. The peloton came close to catching him – with Simon Gerrans second and Fabio Felline – but Cummings had time to celebrate as he crossed the line. Cummings's victory came just hours after he had said in an interview with Cyclingnews.com that he would attempt to win stages with late attacks; it was his second such victory of the year, after a stage of the Tirreno–Adriatico. Landa retained his overall lead, with no  change in the top ten riders.

Stage 4 

7 April 2016 – Lesaka to Orio, 

The fourth stage of the race once again included several late climbs, coming at the end of a  course. The racing started in Lesaka, where Stage 3 had finished, and took the riders to Orio, travelling principally along the coast. There were two climbs in the first , one first-category and the other third-category. There was then a long section of flat roads before a second-category climb with  remaining. There were then three more second-category climbs in the final ; the last two were ascents of different sides of the Alt de Aia, with the last summit coming  from the finish.

The beginning part of the stage was raced hard; a large breakaway formed early and contested the early climbs. Denifl won the first two climbs, but the breakaway was caught and, after , a new breakaway was formed. This was made up of six riders: Simone Petilli (Lampre–Mérida), Tim Wellens (Lotto–Soudal), Christophe Riblon (AG2R La Mondiale), Luis Ángel Maté (Cofidis), Carlos Verona (Etixx–Quick-Step) and Ángel Vicioso (Katusha). The breakaway split on the fourth climb of the day, but re-formed on the descent. Team Sky held their advantage under three minutes for most of the stage and it was reduced further approaching the final climbs; it was around 90 seconds with  remaining.

On the penultimate climb of the day, Warren Barguil attacked and was followed by Roman Kreuziger (Tinkoff), but Astana chased the move down. Meanwhile, Vicioso was dropped from the break; the rest of the breakaway had a one-minute lead going into the final climb. On the final climb, which had sections with a gradient of 28%, Verona attacked and escaped from the breakaway group, with Maté and Wellens chasing. Henao, Contador and Quintana attacked from the peloton, with Landa unable to follow. The riders were in several groups coming off the final climb, but Kreuziger's efforts brought the front groups back together with  remaining. On the final, uncategorised climb, Contador attacked, with Henao following, but Samuel Sánchez came past both of them and descended fast to the finish line, where he won the stage. Rui Costa (Movistar) finished second, on the same time as Sánchez, as part of a sixteen-rider chasing group that included all the main favourites except Landa, who lost eight seconds. Kelderman therefore moved into the race lead, four seconds ahead of Henao, with Landa now seven seconds behind in third place. Sánchez's victory was his first since he won a stage of the 2013 Critérium du Dauphiné and his first since signing for BMC.

Stage 5 

The final road stage of the race included eight categorised climbs, the last of which came just  before the finish. It began where Stage 4 finished, in Orio, and covered a  course to Eibar, where it finished at the top of the Arrate climb. The first  took the riders along the coast, then inland to Eibar. On the way there were two climbs, one third-category and one second-category. The riders then left Eibar to the south for a  circuit that included three second-category climbs. There was then a  circuit to the north of Eibar with a further two second-category climbs. Following the summit, there was a short descent to the finish line.

A large breakaway group formed at the beginning of the stage, consisting of at least eighteen riders. After , Diego Rosa attacked the breakaway. No one followed, and he set off on a solo breakaway. For a significant portion of the stage, Rosa was chased by Maxime Monfort and Sander Armée (both ), but they were not able to reduce his advantage. At the start of the final climb of the day, he had several minutes' lead.

In the peloton, Kelderman's  team was unable to stay with him to the end of the day and he was isolated for the final two climbs. Earlier in the day, he crashed on a corner during a wet descent and was left with rips in his clothing. On the final climb, Mikel Landa attacked from the group of overall favourites; he joined up with his teammate David López, who had been part of the early breakaway. López paced him for some time, with Simon Clarke (Cannondale) also joining the group. They were chased, however, by Tinkoff and brought back on the final climb. Contador then attacked, with only Henao able to follow. Ródriguez and Pinot chased; Kelderman attempted to stay with them but was dropped.

Rosa continued over the final climb and took a solo victory, several minutes ahead of the rest of the field. In the final metres, he stopped, dismounted and crossed the finish line on foot, holding his bike above his head. L'Équipe described his celebration as "unlikely but well deserved", after he had spent most of the stage riding alone. Henao and Contador finished together, two seconds ahead of Ródriguez and Pinot. Kelderman dropped to eighth place after finishing over a minute behind Henao and Contador. Henao took over both the overall lead and the points classification, while Rosa took over the lead of the mountains classification after winning six of the day's seven climbs.

More than thirty riders abandoned the race during the fifth stage. They included Fabio Aru, Dan Martin, Simon Gerrans, Ryder Hesjedal (Trek–Segafredo) and Simon Yates. Many of the retirements came after crashes on the wet roads.

Stage 6 

9 April 2016 – Eibar,  (ITT)

The final stage of the race was a hilly,  individual time trial that started and ended in Eibar.

Seventeen of the riders remaining in the race chose not to compete in the final stage. The first significant time was set by Adam Yates, who crossed the finish line with a time of 30' 06". Other well placed riders, including Pinot, Rodríguez and Landa, struggled on the steep climb. At the top of the climb, Quintana changed from a road bicycle to a time trial bicycle. The only rider able to beat Quintana's time was Alberto Contador. He was 23 seconds up at the top of the climb and finished five seconds ahead by the finish line. Cyclingnews.com suggested after the stage that Quintana's bike change may have cost him the stage victory. Henao, who had lost 46 seconds to Contador on the climb, finished 18 seconds behind and fell to second place overall.

Contador therefore won the race, twelve seconds ahead of Henao, with Quintana moving up to third place overall. It was the third time that he had won the Tour of the Basque Country in the final time trial.

Post-race analysis

Rider reactions 

Alberto Contador had on various previous occasions announced that the 2016 would be his last as a professional racer. After his victory in the Tour of the Basque Country, however, he said "I'm sure this isn't the last time I come here" and said that he would probably continue beyond the 2016 season. It was his first general classification victory since the 2015 Route du Sud; he dedicated the victory to his fans and to Oleg Tinkov, the owner of the Tinkoff team. Sergio Henao said that he had tried a different tactic in the time trial – holding back early on in order to give more effort later in the stage – and said that he was pleased both with his own performance and with how his team had ridden. He said that he was feeling strong ahead of his main objectives for the season, the Ardennes classics. Quintana said that his bike change in the time trial had helped, but that it was not quite enough to win the stage. He said that he was pleased with how he had ridden the race and in particular with how he had recovered from illness earlier in the week.

UCI World Tour standings 

In the 2016 UCI World Tour season-long competition, Contador's victory moved him from third place to second, 59 points behind his teammate Peter Sagan. Sergio Henao moved from eighth to fourth and Quintana from twelfth to fifth. Spain moved into the lead of the nations' ranking, having previously been fifth. Tinkoff retained their overall lead in the teams' ranking, ahead of Team Sky.

Classifications 

In the Tour of the Basque Country, four different jerseys were awarded. The general classification was calculated by adding each cyclist's finishing times on each stage; the leader received a yellow jersey. No bonus seconds were awarded.

The points classification – the leader of which wore a white jersey – was awarded on the basis of positions at stage finishes. The top 15 riders on each stage were awarded points (25 points for first, 20 points for second, 16 for third, 14 for fourth, 12 for fifth, 10 for sixth and one point fewer per place down to a single point for 15th). The rider with the highest number of points overall was the leader of the classification.

There were also two classifications awarded for positions at points in the middle of stages. Each stage (except the individual time trial) included individual sprint points (3, 2 and 1 points respectively for the top three riders); the rider with the highest total led the classification and wore a blue jersey. Each stage also included several categorised climbs, with more points awarded for the most difficult ("first-category") climbs. The rider with the most accumulated points led the classification and wore a red and white jersey.

There was also a classification for teams, in which the times of the best three cyclists from each team on each stage were added together; the team with the lowest total time led the classification.

Classification leadership table

Final classifications

References

Sources

Footnotes

External links 
 
 

Tour of the Basque Country by year
Tour of the Basque Country
Tour of the Basque Country